Replacement(s) or Replace may refer to:

Music 
 The Replacements (band), an American alternative rock band

Film and television
 The Replacements (film), a 2000 American sports comedy
 The Replacement (2021 film), a 2021 Spanish thriller film
 The Replacement (TV series), a 2017 British drama series
 The Replacements (TV series), an American animated series 20062009
 "The Replacement" (Buffy the Vampire Slayer), a 2000 episode of Buffy the Vampire Slayer
 "Replacements" (Band of Brothers), an episode of the TV series Band of Brothers
 "The Replacements" (American Horror Story), an episode of the TV series American Horror Story
 "Replacements", a season 1 episode in the TV series Star Wars: The Bad Batch

Computing
Text replacement (disambiguation)
String replacement
Replacement character, a replacement, a substitute character replacing a missing from available fonts
Replace (command), a command used on DOS, Microsoft Windows and related operating systems

Mathematics
 Axiom schema of replacement, a schema of axioms in Zermelo–Fraenkel set theory
 Replacement rates, in population fertility measurement
 Sampling (statistics), the selection of a subset of individuals from a statistical population

Other uses
 Great Replacement, a white-nationalist, far-right conspiracy theory
 Hip replacement, a surgical procedure
 Knee replacement, a surgical procedure
 "Replacements" (short story), a story by Lisa Tuttle
 Replacements, Ltd., an American retailer
 The Replacement, a 2008 play by Jacob M. Appel

See also
 Replacement level (disambiguation)
 Replaceable (disambiguation)